Riichi (written: 利一 or 理一) is a masculine Japanese given name. Notable people with the name include:

, Japanese Go player
, Japanese badminton player
, Japanese manga artist
, Japanese writer

See also
Japanese Mahjong, or Rīchi mahjong

Japanese masculine given names